Puebla International Airport, officially Hermanos Serdán International Airport  is an international airport located in the municipalities of Tlaltenango, Huejotzingo and Juan C. Bonilla near Puebla, Puebla, Mexico. It handles national and international air traffic for the city of Puebla.

It also serves as an alternate airport for Mexico City, being part of the metropolitan airport group for the Mexican capital, comprising the airports of Mexico City, Toluca, Cuernavaca and Querétaro. The airport used to be a hub for Puebla Air Lines before it ceased operations in 1995.

The airport was opened on 18 November 1985 with a flight from Guadalajara, Mexico operated by a Mexicana de Aviación Boeing 727-200. In 2001 the airport was given in concession to Operadora Estatal de Aeropuertos (OEA) for operation and development. OEA is a company founded specifically to manage and carry out investments to extend airport facilities. The following entities take part in OEA's establishment:

 Puebla State Government (26%)
 Operadora Internacional de Aeropuertos (49%)
 Aeropuertos y Servicios Auxiliares (25%)

In 2003, the US Trade and Development Agency (TDA) provided a grant for US $550,000 to OEA to enable the completion of a project feasibility study regarding the upgrade of the Puebla International Airport. OEA subsequently retained the services of The Louis Berger Group Inc. from the US to complete the study, which concludes that in the long term the airport might serve up to 15 million passengers annually considering that Puebla constitutes the fourth largest city in Mexico in terms of population.

Despite the aforementioned, and although the airport facilities were conceived to alleviate Mexico city's air traffic congestion, their capacities are still underutilized, notwithstanding that they have potential to serve the  Valley of Puebla metropolitan area, which is the settlement of almost three and a half million inhabitants.

Airport development information
In recent years, the Puebla International Airport has showed a notable growth in passenger volume, operations and freight. In 2007 the Logistic Airport Center was opened offering all the facilities for the managing and commercial processing of cargo.

Presently, the airport has reached historical levels in its operative indicators. This situation has permitted members of the Board of Directors to support the decision to begin immediate actions to increase the capacity of the airport in the platforms areas and the Passenger Terminal Building as well.

One of the fastest growing airports in the country, Puebla air terminal served 565,387 passengers in 2021 and 790,931 in 2022.

To arrive at Puebla International Airport there are two main approaches: the first one is through the Mexico - Puebla toll motorway taking the road out at San Miguel Xoxtla and across the Tlaltenango town; the second choice is driving along the Cholula - Huejotzingo boulevard to the access road to the airport, just a bit before coming the village of Huejotzingo, the third option is passing Xoxtla on the Puebla-Mexico tollway and following the Airport exit some kilometers before to reach San Martin Texmelucan.

At the moment, the airport is equipped with a 6 position platform of category D and a terminal building with capacity to take care of 450 passengers per hour.

The new terminal building will be roughly 226% larger than the current one. By investing over USD $15 million, it will be possible to serve 1.1 million passengers in one year. This amount might be even higher assuming a proper air operation distribution.

This airport handles two thousand tons a year in textile products, vehicle motor parts, machinery, post pieces, airborne parcels service and perishables such as fruits and flowers.

An airport lounge at this airport is operated by Global Lounge Network.

As of May 12, 2012, the airport has been closed several times due to volcanic ash from Popocatépetl volcano.

Airlines and destinations

Passengers

Cargo

Destinations map

Statistics

Passengers

Busiest routes

See also 

List of the busiest airports in Mexico

References

External links

 Puebla Intl. Airport

Airports in Puebla
Puebla (city)